Heavy Light is the seventh studio album by Toronto-based musician and producer Meghan Remy, under her solo project U.S. Girls. It was released March 6, 2020 under 4AD.

Critical reception

Heavy Light was met with universal acclaim reviews from critics. At Metacritic, which assigns a weighted average rating out of 100 to reviews from mainstream publications, this release received an average score of 82, based on 16 reviews.

The album received a Juno Award nomination for Alternative Album of the Year at the Juno Awards of 2021.

Accolades

Track listing

References

2020 albums
U.S. Girls albums
4AD albums
Experimental pop albums